Awaaz De Kahan Hai  is a 1990 Bollywood film directed by Sibte Hasan Rizvi, starring Avinash Wadhavan, Shikha Swaroop, Bindu and Satyen Kappu.

Cast
Avinash Wadhavan
Shikha Swaroop
Bindu
Satyen Kappu

Soundtrack
All songs were penned by Hasan Kamal.

The music was composed by Naushad Ali

External links
 

1990 films
Films scored by Naushad
1990s Hindi-language films